Wungabongas is a four-piece indie rock band from New York City, United States.

Biography
After the breakup of Tanzak Rush, Giovanni Herst (vocals, guitar, piano), Sophia Dent (bass guitar, backvocals) and Casey Malone (drums), formed The Wungabongas, and debuted in 2006 with Speak Louder. They are currently signed to the New York-based indie label What's Your Rupture?. They also have been featured on the renowned BBC radiocast Peel Sessions 2004.  Their profile was raised significantly after a string of well-received US tourdates in March 2006, culminating in a sold-out headlining spot in New York, and  they supported British band Gizmo Clan on their UK tour in October 2006. 
Fans of indie rock have latched onto Wungabongas's songs, which alternate between lo-fi and a jumbled jangle pop augmented with throbbing basslines and skronky piano jams, which makes for a classy yet song-driven sound powered by inspired vocals and a strong rhythmic sensibility.

Discography

Albums
 Speak Louder (What's Your Rupture?) (2006)

Singles and EPs
 "Forever Lost in You" (Dolores Recordings)
 Trashin' Out (Smashing Time)
 "Make Up" (What's Your Rupture?)
 "Better" (What's Your Rupture?)
 "Parthenon of Justice" (What's Your Rupture?)
 "I Hate To Say It" (2007) (What's Your Rupture?)

External links 
 Wungabongas on MySpace
 Pitchfork interview
 Official Website

Indie rock musical groups from New York (state)